Terranova is an Italian surname, and may refer to: 
 Cesare Terranova, a magistrate and politician from  Sicily
 Ciro Terranova, a New York City gangster
 Daniela Terranova, Italian composer in the area of concert music and opera 
 Elaine Terranova, an American poet
 Emanuele Terranova, an Italian football player
 Josephine Terranova, American defendant in a murder trial
 Mike Terranova, an Italian football player
 Nadia Terranova, an Italian novelist
 Nicholas Terranova, a New York City gangster
 Orlando Terranova (born 1979), Argentinian rally driver
 Osvaldo Terranova, an Argentine film actor
 Phil Terranova, a boxer
 Vincenzo Terranova, a New York City gangster
 Tiziana Terranova, an Italian theorist and activist
 Vincent Michael "Vinnie" Terranova, fictional character and protagonist in the 1987-1990 CBS TV series Wiseguy; portrayed by Ken Wahl

See also
 Terra Nova (disambiguation)

Italian-language surnames